Pinetop–Lakeside is a town in Navajo County, Arizona, United States.  According to 2020 census, the population of the town is 4,557. It was founded in 1984 when the neighboring towns of Pinetop and Lakeside merged.

Pinetop–Lakeside is a popular summer resort and second-home area for Arizona desert residents. In 2002, a large forest fire, the Rodeo–Chediski Fire, threatened the town and forced an evacuation. The town is near extensive forests, and in normal times is a popular recreational area.

Geography
Pinetop-Lakeside is located at  (34.141913, -109.964047).

Climate
According to the Köppen climate classification system, Pinetop-Lakeside has a Mediterranean dry-summer subtropical climate abbreviated with Csb.

Demographics

At the 2000 census there were 3,582 people, 1,436 households, and 1,020 families in the town. The racial makeup of the town was 89.2% White, 1.0% Black or African American, 2.3% Native American, 0.3% Asian, <0.1% Pacific Islander, 4.6% from other races, and 2.5% from two or more races. 11.4% of the population were Hispanic or Latino of any race.
Of the 1,436 households 30.4% had children under the age of 18 living with them, 58.7% were married couples living together, 8.1% had a female householder with no husband present, and 28.9% were non-families. 23.9% of households were one person and 8.5% were one person aged 65 or older. The average household size was 2.48 and the average family size was 2.92.

The age distribution was 25.5% under the age of 18, 5.5% from 18 to 24, 24.7% from 25 to 44, 29.5% from 45 to 64, and 14.8% 65 or older. The median age was 41 years. For every 100 females, there were 103.1 males. For every 100 females age 18 and over, there were 98.4 males.

The median household income was $36,706 and the median family income  was $42,195. Males had a median income of $36,622 versus $23,594 for females. The per capita income for the town was $18,541. About 6.6% of families and 10.1% of the population were below the poverty line, including 10.6% of those under age 18 and 6.1% of those age 65 or over.

Education
The town is served by the Blue Ridge Unified School District.

Schools that serve the town include Blue Ridge Elementary School, Blue Ridge Middle School, Blue Ridge Junior High School, and Blue Ridge High School.

Notable person
 Zella Day (born 1995) – Singer, songwriter

References

External links
 Official Website
 Official History

Populated places of the Mogollon Rim
Towns in Navajo County, Arizona
1984 establishments in Arizona
Populated places established in 1984